Trachelipus difficilis is a species of woodlouse in the genus Trachelipus belonging to the family Trachelipodidae that can be found in Hungary, Romania and Slovakia.

References

External links

Trachelipodidae
Woodlice of Europe
Crustaceans described in 1950